Qeshlaq-e Hajj Owghlu (also Romanized as Qeshlāq-e Ḩājj Owghlū; also known as Ḩājīoghlū Qeshlāqi) is a village in Qeshlaq Rural District, in the Central District of Ahar County, East Azerbaijan Province, Iran. At the 2006 census, its population was 179, in 39 families.

References 

Populated places in Ahar County